King's Wood may refer to 

in England
King's Wood, Heath and Reach, Bedfordshire
King's Wood, part of the King's Wood and Urchin Wood SSSI, North Somerset
King's Wood School, Harold Hill, Essex
King's Wood, a forest near Molash, Kent
King's Wood, a wood at Micklefield, High Wycombe, Buckinghamshire
King's Wood, Corby, a local nature reserve in Northamptonshire
King's Wood, on the Trentham Estate, Staffordshire and part of the King's and Hargreaves Woods SSSI

other things
King's Wood Symphony, a musical composition

See also 
Kingswood (disambiguation)